Nikolaj Majorov (born 18 August 2000) is a Swedish figure skater. He is the 2020 Swedish national champion.

Personal life 
Majorov was born on 18 August 2000 in Luleå, Sweden. His parents –  Alexander Majorov Sr., a figure skating coach, and Irina Majorova, a choreographer and dance teacher – moved to Sweden from Russia. He is the younger brother of Swedish figure skater Alexander Majorov.

He has stated that his career goal following his competitive skating career is to become a police officer.

Career

Early years 
Majorov began learning to skate in 2002. He competed in the advanced novice ranks through February 2015. His junior international debut came in October 2015 at the International Cup of Nice. He placed 31st at the 2017 World Junior Championships in Taipei, Taiwan.

On the junior level, he is the 2016 Swedish junior national champion, a two-time Nordics champion (2016, 2017), and represented his country at the 2019 World Junior Championships, advancing to the free skate.

2018–2019 season 
Majorov made his senior international debut in October at the 2018 CS Finlandia Trophy. He won silver in the senior men's category in the Swedish Championships in December. Along with his brother, he was assigned to the 2019 European Championships, which took place in January in Minsk, Belarus. He placed twenty-seventh in the short program and did not advance further.

In March, Majorov qualified to the final segment at the 2019 World Junior Championships in Zagreb, Croatia. He ranked twenty-third in the short program, twentieth in the free skate, and twenty-first overall.

2019–2020 season 
Majorov started his season at the 2019 CS Nebelhorn Trophy, where he placed eighth. His season continued at the 2019 CS Warsaw Cup, where he placed eleventh. He won his first Swedish national title in December. He was named to the 2019 European Figure Skating Championships, where he placed fifteenth. Majorov was assigned to make his World Championship debut in Montreal, but the championships were cancelled as a result of the coronavirus pandemic.

2020–2021 season 
Majorov started his season off at the 2020 CS Nebelhorn Trophy, which, due to the pandemic, was attended only by skaters from and training in Europe. Sixth in the short program, he scored a personal best in the free skate and won the bronze medal.  He was assigned to make his Grand Prix debut at the 2020 Internationaux de France, but this event was cancelled as a result of the pandemic.

He participated at the 2021 World Championships, held in his home country, where he placed twentieth in the short program and twenty-third in the free program to finish twenty-third overall. This result qualified a men's place for Sweden at the 2022 Winter Olympics in Beijing. In the free skate, he became the first Swede to land a quadruple Salchow jump (named after Swedish Olympic and World champion Ulrich Salchow) in competition.

2021–2022 season 
Debuting at the 2021 CS Finlandia Trophy, Majorov finished fourth in the short program but fell seventeenth overall after finishing twenty-second in the free skate. In later Challenger appearances he was fourteenth at the 2021 CS Warsaw Cup, and withdrew from the 2021 CS Golden Spin of Zagreb.

After winning a silver medal at the NRW Trophy, Majorov was assigned to compete at the 2022 European Championships but was forced to withdraw after testing positive for COVID-19. Days later it was announced that the Swedish Olympic Committee had decided to allow both Majorov and Josefin Taljegård to take up the Olympic berths they had earned at the previous World Championships, contrary to what was expected based on the criteria. Majorov said that on hearing the news, "I could not believe it, it became so unreal. That reality became what I wanted, my dream came true." Competing in the Olympic men's event, he placed twentieth in the short program, qualifying to the free skate. He finished twenty-first overall. He was nineteenth at the 2022 World Championships to end the season.

2022–2023 season 
Majorov competed in two Challenger events to begin the season, finishing seventh at the 2022 CS Finlandia Trophy and eighth at the 2022 CS Ice Challenge. He then made his Grand Prix debut at the 2022 Grand Prix of Espoo, placing sixth.

Programs

Competitive highlights 
CS: Challenger Series; JGP: Junior Grand Prix

References

External links 

 

2000 births
Swedish male single skaters
Swedish people of Russian descent
Living people
People from Luleå
Figure skaters at the 2022 Winter Olympics
Olympic figure skaters of Sweden
Sportspeople from Norrbotten County